The 1978 Australian Grand Prix was a motor race open to cars complying with Australian Formula 1, (commonly referred to as Formula 5000 cars). It was held on 10 September 1978 at the Sandown International Motor Racing Circuit, in Victoria, Australia.

It was the forty third Australian Grand Prix held and it was the Golden Anniversary AGP with the first being run in 1928. It also doubled as Round 2 of the 1978 Australian Drivers' Championship.

Summary

Qualifying
John McCormack started on pole in his McLaren M23 alongside Kiwi Graham McRae in his own designed and built McRae GM3, complete with a unique clear perspex cockpit cover allowing people to see McRae at work in the car. Before the start McCormack's crew discovered in the warm up that a blown head gasket in qualifying had resulted in damage to the 5.0L Leyland's cylinder heads but had no time to replace it so McCormack started under a cloud. Vern Schuppan qualified his Ansett Team Elfin MR8 3rd with a time equal to that of McRae with the Lola's of Alan Hamilton and Jon Davison rounding out the top 5 qualifiers.

Ian Adams did not practice in his Lola T330, but was permitted to start the race from the rear of the grid.

Race
McRae won the start and was never headed despite slowing on the start/finish line for confirmation of a 'bad sportsmanship' flag for not slowing enough past Coopers crash on lap 22, and a spin at the Dandenong Road corner (turn 7 on the old circuit) on lap 32. During the time of Cooper's crash alone McRae extended his lead over Jon Davison and Vern Schuppan by more than half the length of the almost 1 km long front straight as others slowed for the yellow flags where McRae did not resulting in the bad sportmanship flag for McRae.

Alfredo Costanzo was the first to retire on lap 5 when he lost 2nd gear in Kevin Bartlett's spare Lola T400B, while McCormack retired his McLaren from 3rd place with head gasket failure on lap 6.

McRae won the 49 lap race by two laps from John Briggs driving an older model Matich A51 Repco-Holden, with Peter Edwards in a Lola T332 finishing 3rd. McRae's fastest race lap of 1:01.9 (average speed of 180.29 km/h or 112 mph) was also the fastest lap of the race.

The race was marred by several crashes with two drivers taken to hospital. On lap 22 Garrie Cooper broke some ribs and badly broke his leg in a 250 km/h crash at Rothmans Rise on the back straight, completely destroying his self-designed Elfin MR8 in the process. Cooper's simple explanation of the crash was that "something broke" sending him sliding sideways along the old fence that separated the race track from the horse track. Five laps later, his 3rd placed teammate Vern Schuppan had tangled with the ex-Alan Jones Lola T332 of 2nd placed Jon Davison in turn 1 and had to retire with damage leaving both Ansett Team Elfin cars with heavy damage. The crash also saw Davison retire with his car with terminal damage just moments later at Holden Corner (turn 2). Then with only 3 laps left, Alan Hamilton badly crashed his Lola T430 into the old Dunlop Bridge coming through the high speed causeway onto the main straight. The car crashed into the base of the bridge and was torn in two with Hamilton's body exposed at the front of the car while he was still strapped to his seat (thankfully this time drivers heeded the yellow flags and proceeded slowly through the scene as Hamilton and what was left of his car had bounced back onto the race track). Hamilton was unconscious and was taken to hospital with minor head injuries and some broken bones but went on to make a full recovery.

Classification

Qualifying

Race

Notes
 Pole position: John McCormack - 1:00.9
 Fastest lap: Graham McRae - 1:01.9
 Winner's average speed: 172.76 km/h (107.35 mph)

Post Race Exhibition
After the race, McRae was awarded the Lex Davison Trophy for winning from five time World Champion Juan Manuel Fangio, stating in his short victory speech that he never thought he would ever get to meet Mr Fangio and that he believed it was a greater honour than having won his 3rd AGP. Following this Fangio, Australia's three time world champion, Jack Brabham, Bob Jane driving a Maserati, and former racer turned Holden dealer Bill Patterson driving a Cooper, had a spirited three lap demonstration/race with Fangio and Brabham clearing out and swapping the lead many times. Brabham 'won' the demonstration, just ahead of Fangio, with Patterson and Jane some distance behind in 3rd and 4th.

The 67-year-old Fangio had been invited to the meeting by race organiser's to demonstrate his Mercedes. However the great man stated that he would not demonstrate his World Championship winning Mercedes, he was going to race it. Fangio also intended to drive in a T-shirt like he had in his Formula One days, but had to conform to safety regulations about uncovered body parts and wore a full set of white overalls, though he was permitted to use his old goggles and Herbie Johnson racing helmet.

Despite not having raced competitively for 20 years, Juan Manuel Fangio was still the holder of a full FIA Super Licence.

The fastest lap of the demonstration was a 1:21.6 by Jack Brabham, almost 20 seconds slower than McRae's fastest lap for the Grand Prix.

References

Grand Prix
Australian Grand Prix
Formula 5000 race reports
Motorsport at Sandown
Australian Grand Prix